The Cavendish Laboratory is the Department of Physics at the University of Cambridge, and is part of the School of Physical Sciences. The laboratory was opened in 1874 on the New Museums Site as a laboratory for experimental physics and is named after the British chemist and physicist Henry Cavendish. The laboratory has had a huge influence on research in the disciplines of physics and biology.

The laboratory moved to its present site in West Cambridge in 1974.

, 30 Cavendish researchers have won Nobel Prizes. Notable discoveries to have occurred at the Cavendish Laboratory include the discovery of the electron, neutron, and structure of DNA.

Founding

The Cavendish Laboratory was initially located on the New Museums Site, Free School Lane, in the centre of Cambridge. It is named after British chemist and physicist Henry Cavendish for contributions to science and his relative William Cavendish, 7th Duke of Devonshire, who served as chancellor of the university and donated funds for the construction of the laboratory.

Professor James Clerk Maxwell, the developer of electromagnetic theory, was a founder of the laboratory and the first Cavendish Professor of Physics. The Duke of Devonshire had given to Maxwell, as head of the laboratory, the manuscripts of Henry Cavendish's unpublished Electrical Works. The editing and publishing of these was Maxwell's main scientific work while he was at the laboratory. Cavendish's work aroused Maxwell's intense admiration and he decided to call the Laboratory (formerly known as the Devonshire Laboratory) the Cavendish Laboratory and thus to commemorate both the Duke and Henry Cavendish.

Physics
Several important early physics discoveries were made here, including the discovery of the electron by J.J. Thomson (1897)  the Townsend discharge by John Sealy Townsend, and the development of the cloud chamber by C.T.R. Wilson.

Ernest Rutherford became Director of the Cavendish Laboratory in 1919. Under his leadership the neutron was discovered by James Chadwick in 1932, and in the same year the first experiment to split the nucleus in a fully controlled manner was performed by students working under his direction; John Cockcroft and Ernest Walton.

Physical chemistry
Physical Chemistry (originally the department of Colloid Science led by Eric Rideal) had left the old Cavendish site, subsequently locating as the Department of Physical Chemistry (under RG Norrish) in the then new chemistry building with the Department of Chemistry (led by Lord Todd) in Lensfield Road: both chemistry departments merged in the 1980s.

Nuclear physics
In World War II the laboratory carried out research for the MAUD Committee, part of the British Tube Alloys project of research into the atomic bomb. Researchers included Nicholas Kemmer, Alan Nunn May, Anthony French, Samuel Curran and the French scientists including Lew Kowarski and Hans von Halban. Several transferred to Canada in 1943; the Montreal Laboratory and some later to the Chalk River Laboratories.
The production of plutonium and neptunium by bombarding uranium-238 with neutrons was predicted in 1940 by two teams working independently: Egon Bretscher and Norman Feather at the Cavendish and Edwin M. McMillan and Philip Abelson at Berkeley Radiation Laboratory at the University of California, Berkeley.

Biology
The Cavendish Laboratory has had an important influence on biology, mainly through the application of X-ray crystallography to the study of structures of biological molecules. Francis Crick already worked in the Medical Research Council Unit, headed by Max Perutz and housed in the Cavendish Laboratory, when James Watson came from the United States and they made a breakthrough in discovering the structure of DNA. For their work while in the Cavendish Laboratory, they were jointly awarded the Nobel Prize in Physiology or Medicine in 1962, together with Maurice Wilkins of King's College London, himself a graduate of St. John's College, Cambridge.

The discovery was made on 28 February 1953; the first Watson/Crick paper appeared in Nature on 25 April 1953. Sir Lawrence Bragg, the director of the Cavendish Laboratory, where Watson and Crick worked, gave a talk at Guy's Hospital Medical School in London on Thursday 14 May 1953 which resulted in an article by Ritchie Calder in the News Chronicle of London, on Friday 15 May 1953, entitled "Why You Are You. Nearer Secret of Life." The news reached readers of The New York Times the next day; Victor K. McElheny, in researching his biography, Watson and DNA: Making a Scientific Revolution, found a clipping of a six-paragraph New York Times article written from London and dated 16 May 1953 with the headline "Form of `Life Unit' in Cell Is Scanned." The article ran in an early edition and was then pulled to make space for news deemed more important. (The New York Times subsequently ran a longer article on 12 June 1953). The Cambridge University undergraduate newspaper Varsity also ran its own short article on the discovery on Saturday 30 May 1953. Bragg's original announcement of the discovery at a Solvay Conference on proteins in Belgium on 8 April 1953 went unreported by the British press.

Sydney Brenner, Jack Dunitz, Dorothy Hodgkin, Leslie Orgel, and Beryl M. Oughton, were some of the first people in April 1953 to see the model of the structure of DNA, constructed by Crick and Watson; at the time they were working at the University of Oxford's Chemistry Department. All were impressed by the new DNA model, especially Brenner who subsequently worked with Crick at Cambridge in the Cavendish Laboratory and the new Laboratory of Molecular Biology. According to the late Dr. Beryl Oughton, later Rimmer, they all travelled together in two cars once Dorothy Hodgkin announced to them that they were off to Cambridge to see the model of the structure of DNA. Orgel also later worked with Crick at the Salk Institute for Biological Studies.

Present site

Due to overcrowding in the old buildings, it moved to its present site in West Cambridge in the early 1970s. It is due to move again to a third site currently under construction in West Cambridge.

Nobel Laureates at the Cavendish

 John William Strutt, 3rd Baron Rayleigh (Physics, 1904)
 Sir J. J. Thomson (Physics, 1906)
 Ernest Rutherford (Chemistry, 1908)
 Sir William Lawrence Bragg (Physics, 1915)
 Charles Glover Barkla (Physics, 1917)
 Francis William Aston (Chemistry, 1922)
 Charles Thomson Rees Wilson (Physics, 1927)
 Arthur Compton (Physics, 1927)
 Sir Owen Willans Richardson (Physics, 1928)
 Sir James Chadwick (Physics, 1935)
 Sir George Paget Thomson (Physics, 1937)
 Sir Edward Victor Appleton (Physics, 1947)
 Patrick Blackett, Baron Blackett (Physics, 1948)
 Sir John Cockcroft (Physics, 1951)
 Ernest Walton (Physics, 1951)
 Francis Crick (Physiology or Medicine, 1962)
 James Watson (Physiology or Medicine, 1962)
 Max Perutz (Chemistry, 1962)
 Sir John Kendrew (Chemistry, 1962)
 Dorothy Hodgkin (Chemistry, 1964)
 Brian Josephson (Physics, 1973)
 Sir Martin Ryle (Physics, 1974)
 Antony Hewish (Physics, 1974)
 Sir Nevill Francis Mott (Physics, 1977)
 Philip Warren Anderson (Physics, 1977)
 Pyotr Kapitsa (Physics, 1978)
 Allan McLeod Cormack (Physiology or Medicine, 1979)
 Mohammad Abdus Salam (Physics, 1979)
 Sir Aaron Klug (Chemistry, 1982)
 Didier Queloz (Physics, 2019)

Cavendish Professors of Physics

The Cavendish Professors were the heads of the department until the tenure of Sir Brian Pippard, during which period the roles separated.

 James Clerk Maxwell FRS FRSE 1871–1879
 John William Strutt, 3rd Baron Rayleigh  1879–1884
 Sir Joseph J. Thomson FRS 1884–1919
 Ernest Rutherford FRS, 1st Baron Rutherford of Nelson 1919–1937
 Sir William Lawrence Bragg CH OBE MC FRS 1938–1953
 Sir Nevill Francis Mott CH FRS 1954–1971
 Sir Brian Pippard FRS 1971–1984
 Sir Sam Edwards FRS 1984–1995
 Sir Richard Friend FRS FREng 1995–present

Heads of department 

 Professor Sir Alan Cook FRS FRSE 1979-1984
 Professor Archie Howie CBE FRS 1989-1997
 Professor Malcolm Longair† CBE FRS FRSE 1997-2005
 Professor Peter Littlewood FRS 2005-2011
 Professor James Stirling† CBE FRS 2011-2013
 Professor Michael Andrew Parker 2013 -

† Jacksonian Professors of Natural Philosophy

Cavendish Groups

Areas in which the Laboratory has been influential  include:-

 Shoenberg Laboratory for Quantum Matter, led by Gil Lonzarich
 Superconductivity Josephson junction, led by Brian Pippard
 Theory of Condensed Matter,  which is the dominant theoretical group.
 Electron Microscopy Group  led by Archie Howie
 Radio Astronomy (led by Martin Ryle and Antony Hewish), with the Cavendish Astrophysics Groups telescopes being based at Mullard Radio Astronomy Observatory.
Semiconductor Physics
 Atomic, Mesoscopic and Optical Physics (AMOP) Group led by Zoran Hadzibabic
 Nanophotonics group led by Jeremy Baumberg
 Structure and Dynamics Group, led by Jacqui Cole
 Laboratory for Scientific Computing led by Nikos Nikiforakis
 Biological and Soft Systems Group led by Pietro Cicuta

Cavendish staff
 the laboratory is headed by Andy Parker   and the Cavendish Professor of Physics is Sir Richard Friend.

Notable senior academic staff
 senior academic staff (Professors or Readers) include:

 Jeremy Baumberg FRS, Professor of Nanoscience and Fellow of Jesus College, Cambridge
 Jacqui Cole, Professor of Molecular Engineering
 Athene Donald FRS, Professor of Experimental Physics, Master of Churchill College, Cambridge
 Sir Richard Friend FRS, FREng, Cavendish Professor of Physics and Fellow of St John's College, Cambridge
 Stephen Gull, University Professor of Physics
 Sir Michael Pepper FRS, Kt, Honorary Professor of Pharmaceutical Science in the University of Otago, New Zealand
 Didier Queloz FRS, professor at the Battcock Centre for Experimental Astrophysics
 James Floyd Scott FRS,  professor and director of research
 Ben Simons FRS, Herchel Smith Professor of Physics
 Henning Sirringhaus FRS, Hitachi Professor of Electron Device Physics and head of Microelectronics and Optoelectronics Group
 Sarah Teichmann FRS, principal research associate and Fellow of Trinity College, Cambridge

Notable emeritus professors
The Cavendish is home to a number of emeritus scientists, pursuing their research interests in the laboratory after their formal retirement.

 Mick Brown FRS, emeritus professor
 Volker Heine, FRS, emeritus professor
 Brian Josephson, FRS, emeritus professor
 Archibald Howie, FRS, emeritus professor
 Malcolm Longair, CBE, FRS, FRSE, Emeritus Jacksonian Professor of Natural Philosophy
 Gil Lonzarich, FRS Emeritus Professor of Condensed Matter Physics and professorial fellow at Trinity College, Cambridge
 Bryan Webber, FRS Emeritus Professor of Theoretical High Energy Physics and professorial fellow at Emmanuel College, Cambridge

Other notable alumni
Besides the Nobel Laureates, the Cavendish has many distinguished alumni including:

Louis Harold Gray 
 Richard Edwin Hills 
 Olga Kennard 
 Andrew D. Maynard at Arizona State University
 John Rodenburg 
 Henry Snaith 
 Evan James Williams 
 Richard Jones

References

Further reading

External links

 Austin Memories—History of Austin and Longbridge Cavendish Article

 
Departments in the Faculty of Physics and Chemistry, University of Cambridge
1874 establishments in the United Kingdom
Research institutes in Cambridge
Physics laboratories
University and college laboratories in the United Kingdom
Physics departments in the United Kingdom